Conrad James "Connie" Zelencik (May 13, 1955 – May 22, 2021) was an American professional football player who was a center for the Buffalo Bills of the National Football League (NFL) in 1977. He died on May 22, 2021, in Dyer, Indiana, at age 66.

References

External links
Pro-Football-Reference

1955 births
2021 deaths
American football centers
Buffalo Bills players
People from Calumet City, Illinois
Purdue Boilermakers football players
Players of American football from Illinois